Vriesea corcovadensis is a plant species in the genus Vriesea. This species is endemic to Brazil.

Cultivars
 Vriesea 'Deutscher Zwerg'
 Vriesea 'Gnom'
 Vriesea 'Komet'

References

BSI Cultivar Registry Retrieved 11 October 2009

corcovadensis
Flora of Brazil